John Schlecht (born May 23, 1978) is a former American football defensive tackle. He played for the San Francisco 49ers in 2001.

References

1978 births
Living people
Players of American football from Saint Paul, Minnesota
American football defensive tackles
Minnesota Golden Gophers football players
San Francisco 49ers players
Frankfurt Galaxy players